Victor Vlad Cornea and Sergio Martos Gornés were the defending champions but only Martos Gornés chose to defend his title, partnering Marco Bortolotti. Martos Gornés lost in the semifinals to Matteo Gigante and Francesco Passaro.

Christian Harrison and Shintaro Mochizuki won the title after defeating Gigante and Passaro 6–4, 6–3 in the final.

Seeds

Draw

References

External links
 Main draw

Tenerife Challenger II - Doubles
Tenerife Challenger